Until the End of Time is a 2017 Algerian drama film directed by Yasmine Chouikh. It was selected as the Algerian entry for the Best Foreign Language Film at the 91st Academy Awards, but it was not nominated. The film was the second-ever directed by a woman to be submitted by Algeria to the Academy Awards.

See also
 List of submissions to the 91st Academy Awards for Best Foreign Language Film
 List of Algerian submissions for the Academy Award for Best Foreign Language Film

References

External links
 

2017 films
2017 drama films
2010s Arabic-language films
Algerian drama films